Abroma augustum, sometimes written Abroma augusta, Devil's cotton, is a species of Abroma (Sterculiaceae, or Malvaceae in some classifications). It has dark red flowers with an characteristic and unusual appearance. It is widely distributed in Asia. It was previously thought to grow in north Queensland but the most recent survey did not find it.

The leaves and stems are covered with soft bristly hairs that are very irritating to the touch. The bark yields a jute-like fiber.

The species was first described, as Theobroma augustum (or Theobroma augusta) by Carl Linnaeus in 1768.

Cultivation
In the greenhouse, plants bloom from late spring to early summer. Dark maroon flowers are formed in terminal panicles. Individual flowers are up to 3 inches (7.5 cm) across.

Abroma augustum is propagated from seed. Seed germinate in 21–30 days at 72 °F (24 °C).

References

Byttnerioideae
Flora of Asia
Plants described in 1768
Taxa named by Carl Linnaeus